Alfred James Louis Joseph de Bougy (5 November 1814 — 4 September 1871), French poet and author, was born in Grenoble. He died in Thonon-les-Bains. He also wrote under the pen-name of Ethelred Bergeville.

Works
 Histoire de la Bibliothèque Sainte-Geneviève, Paris: Comon, 1847
 Les Bourla-Papei ou brûleurs de papiers, 1988
 Un million de rimes gauloises: Fleur de la poésie drolatique et badine depuis le XVe siècle recueillie, Paris: Adolphe Delahays, 1858

1814 births
1874 deaths
Writers from Grenoble
French male poets
19th-century French poets
19th-century French male writers